This is a partial list of molecules that contain 12 carbon atoms.

C12H0 – C12H8

C12H9 – C12H11

C12H12 – C12H14

C12H15 – C12H17

C12H18 – C12H19

C12H20 – C12H21

C12H22

C12H23 – C12H27

C12H28 – C12Hmany

See also
Carbon number
 List of compounds with carbon number 11
 List of compounds with carbon number 13

C12